Stay-In Love is a Philippine romantic comedy television series starring Maris Racal and Kokoy de Santos. The series was aired on TV5's Primetime Todo evening block from November 24, 2020 to February 16, 2021.

Plot
Diding (Maris Racal) applies to be a maid for a rich, social family where she met Mon (Kokoy de Santos).

Cast and characters

Main cast
 Maris Racal as Diding Saclolo
 Kokoy de Santos as Mon Ortega
 Marc David as Hero Cacao

Supporting cast
 Ruffa Gutierrez as Gigi Lacambra
 Bobby Andrews as Chris Ortega
 Pooh as Dencio Saclolo
 Ashley Colet as Vanna Lacambra
 Denise Joaquin as Beverly
 Charm Aranton as Gelly
 Elsa Droga as Pipay
 Welwel Silvestre as Zsa Zsa
 Meann Espinosa as Manang Luz

Production
Iñigo Pascual was supposedly part of the main cast to play the role of Mon. Due to his conflicting schedules, however, he was later pulled out from the cast. Pascual would be later replaced by Kokoy de Santos in the role of Mon.

References

External links
 

TV5 (Philippine TV network) drama series
Filipino-language television shows
Philippine comedy-drama television series
Philippine romantic comedy television series
2020 Philippine television series debuts
2021 Philippine television series endings
Television series by Cignal Entertainment
Television shows set in the Philippines